Joris Correa (born 25 December 1993) is a French professional footballer who plays as a forward for  Ligue 2 club Grenoble.

Professional career
Correa made his professional debut with his youth club SC Bastia in a 2–0 Ligue 1 win over Stade de Reims on 22 March 2014. After spending his early career in the lower divisions of France, he joined US Orléans in the Ligue 2 for three years on 11 May 2019.

Personal life
Correa was born in France, and is of Senegalese descent.

References

External links
 
 Foot-National Profile

Living people
1993 births
Sportspeople from Saint-Denis, Seine-Saint-Denis
Association football forwards
French footballers
French sportspeople of Senegalese descent
US Orléans players
FC Chambly Oise players
CS Sedan Ardennes players
SC Bastia players
Grenoble Foot 38 players
Ligue 1 players
Ligue 2 players
Championnat National 2 players
Championnat National 3 players
Footballers from Seine-Saint-Denis